Mount Carmel Roman Catholic High School is a coeducational Roman Catholic secondary school located in Accrington, a town located in the county of Lancashire, England.

A Roman Catholic school - “A family of faith and learning”. It is a voluntary aided school administered by the Lancashire County Council and the Roman Catholic Diocese of Salford. The school offers GCSEs and BTECs as study programs for pupils. The school was formed in 1978 by the merger of the Holy Family, a secondary modern school, and the Paddock House Convent Grammar School, a former direct grant grammar school.

The current Headteacher is Xavier Bowers. In 2019, Paul Dugdale was appointed Deputy Headteacher. In April 2020, Caroline Farrelly was appointed Deputy Headteacher. Farrelly was previously an Assistant Headteacher at St Monica's High School in Prestwich and Subject Leader of English at The Hollins.

Notable former pupils
Helen Briggs, actor
Richard Chaplow, footballer
Matthew O'Neill, footballer

References

External links

Secondary schools in Lancashire
Schools in Hyndburn
Accrington
Catholic secondary schools in the Diocese of Salford
Voluntary aided schools in England